C.J. Rapp is an American beverage inventor best known for inventing and marketing high-caffeine Jolt Cola.

In 1985, C. J. Rapp developed Jolt Cola, which contains 72 milligrams of caffeine, which is the maximum amount permitted by the US Food and Drug Administration. He attended McQuaid Jesuit High School in Rochester, New York. As a sociology major at SUNY Potsdam, Rapp noticed that students concocted beverages to help them stay awake to finish term papers, complete research projects, or study for exams.

At a time when beverage producers were promoting the idea that less is better - that they contained either zero or less caffeine, sugar, or calories - Rapp promoted his cola by emphasizing that it had twice the caffeine found in other colas. In the mid-1980s the slogan on every bottle and can of Jolt read "Twice the Caffeine."

The approach worked and gave the new product high visibility. Jolt soon appeared on the David Letterman show, Good Morning America and CNN. The maverick cola quickly found its niche market.

Rapp slowly began expanding his product line, which now includes Blu Botl, DNA, Martinelli's, Pirate's Keg, First Tee, and XTC. His company, Wet Planet Beverages, markets ten beverage brands in 22 countries. The company tends to use creative packaging.

See also
Red Bull

References

Other sources 

 Beer You Can Bet On

20th-century American inventors
Cola
State University of New York at Potsdam alumni
Businesspeople from Rochester, New York
Year of birth missing (living people)
Living people